Henri Helou (born 3 July 1953 in Beirut, Lebanon), is a Lebanese politician and a member of the Lebanese Parliament and a member of the Democratic Gathering Bloc.

Biography
Helou is the son of Lebanese MP . His maternal grandfather is the renowned Lebanese politician, Member of Parliament, writer and journalist Michel Chiha. Initially French educated, Helou received his higher education in the United States at Cornell University studying engineering and then moved to al-Khobar in Saudi Arabia for work. He later received his master's degree in civil engineering at University of London. He was chosen as the architect in charge of building the palace of the former Emir of Qatar in Cannes. He also lived for a few years in Montreal, Quebec, Canada.

Helou ran for Lebanese parliament in 2003 following his father Pierre Helou's death who was a member of the Parliament. In a partial election to fill in the vacancy in the Christian Maronite seat in the Baabda-Aley electoral district, Henri Helou beat rival candidate and pro-Aounist candidate Hekmat Deeb. He also enrolled again in 2010 at the American University in Beirut for further studies.

Helou was nominated by Walid Jumblatt and his Progressive Socialist Party (PSP) for the Lebanese presidential elections in 2014. In the first round, requiring two-thirds of the 128 Lebanese MPs (meaning 86 votes), on 23 April 2014, Lebanese Forces leader Samir Geagea received 48 votes, whereas Henri Helou received 16 votes and former president Amine Gemayel 1 vote, with 52 blank votes and seven void cancelled votes. As all the MPs left after the vote, there was no quorum to hold the second round, which needed only a simple majority of votes.

Helou's candidacy remained on the ballots for 45 unsuccessful rounds, but was withdrawn when it became obvious that General Michel Aoun would win and Jumblatt personally supported Aoun's candidacy and pledged that a big majority of his bloc's MPs would also vote for Aoun instead of their own Progressive Socialist Party-supported candidate Helou.

Helou is married with Marianne Matrasse and has three children.

References

1953 births
Alumni of the University of London
Cornell University alumni
Living people
Politicians from Beirut
Lebanese Maronites
Candidates for President of Lebanon
Progressive Socialist Party politicians